Michael Parker born December 5, 1981, is a US-born Japanese professional basketball player.  He currently plays for the Gunma Crane Thunders of the Japanese B.League.

Career statistics 

|-
| align="left" |  2007-08
| align="left" | Fukuoka
| 27 || 22 || 33.7 ||.601  ||.242  ||.587  ||8.2  ||1.1  ||bgcolor="CFECEC"|2.6  || 1.6 || 17.0
|-
| align="left" | 2008-09
| align="left" | Fukuoka
| 49 || 49 || 39.5 ||.484  || .330 || .691 ||12.6  || 1.8 ||bgcolor="CFECEC"| 2.6 || 2.1 || bgcolor="CFECEC"|26.8
|-
| align="left" |  2009-10
| align="left" | Fukuoka
| 52 || 52 || 40.0 ||.476  ||.212  ||.690  || 10.9 || 2.9 ||bgcolor="CFECEC"|2.9  || 1.7 ||bgcolor="CFECEC"| 26.5
|-
| align="left" |  2010-11
| align="left" | Fukuoka
| 50 || 50 || 39.3 || .561 ||.262  || .705 ||10.5  ||2.0  ||bgcolor="CFECEC"|2.3  || 1.4 ||  bgcolor="CFECEC"| 27.3
|-
| align="left" | 2011-12
| align="left" | Shimane
| 50 || 50 || 38.2 || .507 ||.207  ||.694  ||9.9  ||2.3  ||2.4  ||0.9  ||bgcolor="CFECEC"|23.1
|-
| align="left" |  2012-13
| align="left" | Shimane
| 51 || 51 || 38.6 || .538 || .316 || .655 || 10.2 || 2.1 ||bgcolor="CFECEC"| 2.3 || 1.6 ||19.5
|-
| align="left" | 2013-14
| align="left" | Wakayama
| 54 ||54 || 36.6||bgcolor="CFECEC"| .621 || .329 || .644 || 12.4 || 1.6 || 2.0 || 2.1 ||  23.1
|-
| align="left" | 2014-15
| align="left" | Wakayama/Toyota
| 48 ||26 || 26.0 || .575 || .232 || .614 || 8.5 || 1.2 || 1.8 || 1.1 || 14.0
|-
| align="left" |  2015-16
| align="left" | Toyota
|47 ||47 ||25.1 ||.626  ||.293  ||.667  ||6.4  ||1.3  || 1.9 ||1.2  ||13.8
|-
| align="left" |  2016-17
| align="left" | Chiba
|60 ||60 ||29.9 ||.590  ||.260  ||.719  ||8.5  ||1.2  || 1.7 ||1.8  ||12.6
|-
| align="left" |  2017-18
| align="left" | Chiba
|60 ||59 ||25.3 ||.641  ||.258  ||.574  ||8.1  ||1.7  ||bgcolor="CFECEC"| 1.9 ||1.1  ||12.7
|-

External links
Stats in Japan

References

1981 births
Living people
Alvark Tokyo players
American expatriate basketball people in Austria
American expatriate basketball people in Ireland
American expatriate basketball people in Japan
American men's basketball players
BSC Fürstenfeld Panthers players
Chiba Jets Funabashi players
College men's basketball players in the United States
Evergreen State College alumni
Japanese men's basketball players
Japanese people of African-American descent
Junior college men's basketball players in the United States
Power forwards (basketball)
Rizing Zephyr Fukuoka players
Shimane Susanoo Magic players
Wakayama Trians players